Carlos Javier Muñiz (born March 12, 1981) is an American former Major League Baseball relief pitcher.

Muñiz made his major league debut on September 25, . He threw 1.1 innings and gave up 2 earned runs.

Muñiz was called up to the Mets on May 27, to replace injured pitcher Matt Wise in the bullpen. He was then sent back down to the New Orleans Zephyrs, which was the Mets Triple-A affiliate prior to 2009. He was then recalled on June 25 when Claudio Vargas was designated for assignment.

External links

1981 births
Living people
New York Mets players
Baseball players from Torrance, California
Major League Baseball pitchers
American baseball players of Mexican descent
Brooklyn Cyclones players
Hagerstown Suns players
St. Lucie Mets players
New Orleans Zephyrs players
Buffalo Bisons (minor league) players
Long Beach State Dirtbags baseball players